Victoria Libertas (also known as "VL" or in Italian Vuelle), full name Unione Sportiva Victoria Libertas Pallacanestro, is a professional basketball team that is based in Pesaro, Italy. The club competes in the top level Italian professional basketball league, the Lega Basket Serie A (LBA). It was commonly known across Europe as Scavolini Pesaro, from the name of its historical main sponsor Scavolini (from 1975 to 2014), an Italian kitchen and bathroom products designer and manufacturer, whose co-founder Valter Scavolini was formerly club president. Now, it is known as Carpegna Prosciutto Basket Pesaro after its title sponsor. For past club sponsorship names, see the list below.

History
Victoria Libertas was officially founded in 1946 and had its best seasons during the 1980s. After being among the top teams in Italy for decades, Victoria Libertas under the name Scavolini Pesaro, won its first important trophy the 1982–83 FIBA European Cup Winners' Cup, rival the historic French club of ASVEL. Also Scavolini, participated in consecutive lost finals in 1985–86 against the title holder FC Barcelona and in 1986–87 against Cibona. Since then, Italian League was won twice (in 1988 and 1990), and the Italian Cup was also won twice (in 1985 and 1992). Scavolini participated in 1990–91 FIBA European Champions Cup, and managed to play in the semi-final of the Final Four in Paris where the club eliminated by the legendary Pop 84 (the former Jugoplastika) and ranked fourth after one more defeat in the third place game by Maccabi Tel Aviv. The two lost finals in the FIBA Korać Cup in 1990 (against Ram Joventut) and in 1992 (against il Messaggero Roma) show the dynamic of the club and at the beginning of the new decade.
In recent years, Victoria Libertas was among the best European teams, having played the Euroleague in 2001–02 and 2004–05 seasons. In 2004–05 it unexpectedly got to the Euroleague Top-8 and was defeated in the quarter finals by the eventual champion Maccabi Tel Aviv. Furthermore, Victoria Libertas shooting guard, Charles Smith, was honored with the first-ever Euroleague's Alphonso Ford Top Scorer Trophy, named after the late Euroleague scoring champ who died in 2004 and who was replaced in Victoria Libertas by Smith himself.

Recent history

In July 2005, as a consequence of the poor administration of the previous two seasons, Victoria Libertas failed to remain within the parameters required to join the Italian Basketball League and wound up. Pesaro's second team, Falco Spar, agreed with former Victoria Libertas president Valter Scavolini to join forces to invest in a team to bring back Victoria Libertas to Italian First Division (Lega Basket Serie A).

The new team, named Scavolini Gruppo Spar (or simply Scavolini-Spar), played the 2005–06 season in the Italian Third Division (B1). Owners' target resulted in Scavolini-Spar having large amounts of money at its disposal compared with the other teams of the league. Players from the upper divisions were enrolled, star Carlton Myers among them, which lead the team to win the league and gain promotion to the Second Division (LegaDue).

In 2006–07 Scavolini-Spar won the LegaDue playoff series, lining up players such as Carlton Myers, Rodney White (9th overall pick of the 2001 NBA draft), Mindaugas Žukauskas (captain of the Lithuanian national basketball team) and Michael Hicks (Panamian national team star). The team was therefore promoted, for the second straight year, to play the Lega Basket Serie A 2007–08 league.

Following the 2009–10 season, Spar's secondary sponsorship contract expired. The club picked up a new secondary sponsor in Italian clothing company Siviglia, thereby changing its full sponsored name to Scavolini Siviglia Style Pesaro (more simply Scavolini Siviglia Pesaro). The club changed its secondary sponsorship again with the expiration of Siviglia's contract at the end of the 2011–12 season, becoming Scavolini Banca Marche Pesaro.

From the 2014–15 season the historical sponsor Scavolini was replaced (for the first time since 1975) by the new main sponsor Consultinvest, whereby the name of the team became Consultinvest Pesaro. Since 2019 summer the new club naming is Carpegna Prosciutto Basket Pesaro thanks to the relationship with the new Title Sponsor Prosciutto di Carpegna.

Players

Current roster

Honours
Total titles: 5

Domestic competitions
Italian League
 Winners (2): 1987–88, 1989–90
 Runners-up (4): 1981–82, 1984–85, 1991–92, 1993–94
Italian Cup
 Winners (2): 1984–85, 1991–92
 Runner-up (5): 1985–85, 1986–87, 2000–01, 2003–04, 2021
Italian Supercup
 Runners-up (1): 2001

European competitions
EuroLeague
 4th place (1): 1990–91
 Final Four (1): 1991
FIBA Saporta Cup (defunct)
 Winners (1): 1982–83
 Runners-up (2): 1985–86, 1986–87
 Semifinalists (2): 1983–84, 1987–88
FIBA Korać Cup (defunct)
 Runners-up (2): 1989–90, 1991–92
FIBA EuroChallenge
 4th place (1): 2009–10
 Final Four (1): 2010

Worldwide competitions
McDonald's Championship (defunct)
 4th place (2): 1988, 1990

Other competitions
FIBA International Christmas Tournament (defunct)
 4th place (1): 1996
Torneo de Vasco Martini-Castelfiorentino
 Winners (1): 2007

International record

Logos

Arena and supporters
In 1996 Victoria Libertas moved from the historic "hangar" arena into the new BPA Palas arena (today: Vitrifrigo Arena) which now hosts its home games. Drawing large audiences from nearby towns and the whole Marche region, in mid 2000s Victoria Libertas was among the top ten basketball teams in Europe for average attendance.

Notable players

Head coaches
  Petar Skansi 2 seasons: '81-'82, '82-'83
  Aleksandar Nikolić 1 seasons: '83-'84
  Valerio Bianchini 5 seasons: '87-'88, '88-'89, '93-'94, '94-'95, '95-'96
  Sergio Scariolo 2 seasons: '89-'90, '90-'91
  Duško Vujošević 1 season: '97-'98
  Marco Crespi 2 seasons: '02-'03, '04-'05
  Piero Bucchi 1 season: '16-17
  Spiro Leka 1 season '17-'18
  Massimo Galli 1 season '18-'19
  Matteo Boniciolli 1 season '19
  Federico Perego 1 season '19-present

Sponsorship names
In the past, due to sponsorship deals, it has also been known as:

Benelli Pesaro (1952–58)
Lanco Pesaro (1958–61)
Algor Pesaro (1961–63)
Butangas Pesaro (1966–69)
Frizz Pelmo Pesaro (1969–70)
Tropicali Pesaro (1970–71)
Maxmobili Pesaro (1971–75)
Scavolini Pesaro (1975–2014)
Consultinvest Pesaro (2014–2017)
No Main Sponsor (2017–2019)
Carpegna Prosciutto Basket Pesaro (2019–present)

References

External links 
Official Site 
Eurobasket.com Team Page
Previous Season Stats (LegaBasket 2007–08) 
Latest Stats (LegaBasket 2008–09) 

1946 establishments in Italy
Basketball teams established in 1946
Basketball teams in the Marche
Sport in Pesaro